Marc Herbert (born 7 January 1987), also known by the nicknames of "Marty", and "Herby", is a professional rugby league footballer who currently plays halfback in the Canberra Rugby League Competition. He made his NRL début in the Round 20 clash against the Gold Coast Titans, in place of the suspended Todd Carney.

2008
After three seasons playing for their developmental sides, Herbert made his first grade début for the Raiders in 2008.

2010
On 29 October 2010, Herbert agreed a one-year deal with the Bradford Bulls as a direct replacement for Matt Orford. He undertook pre-season training with the Bulls in November and is the 10th signing the club has made. Bradford beat off stiff competition from Hull F.C. and another unnamed Super League team.

2011
In the 2011 Season Herbert appeared in two of the four pre-season games. He played against Halifax and Wakefield Trinity Wildcats. He scored a try and a goal against Halifax and kicked a goal against Wakefield.

He featured in ten consecutive games from Round 4 (Wakefield Trinity Wildcats to Round 13 (Warrington Wolves). He missed a couple of games due to injury but then returned and played ten consecutive games from Round 16 (Harlequins RL) to Round 25 (Wigan Warriors). A broken hand ended Herbert's Bulls career early. He also featured in the Challenge Cup game against Halifax. Herbert has scored against Huddersfield Giants (1 try), Salford City Reds (2 tries, 2 goals) and Hull Kingston Rovers (1 try).

2015
Herbert has been playing for the Queanbeyan Blues in the Canberra Rugby League Competition for 2015.

Personal life
Herbert currently works as a project engineer in Canberra.

References

External links
Marc Herbert Raiders Profile

1987 births
Living people
Australian rugby league players
Australian expatriate sportspeople in England
Bradford Bulls players
Canberra Raiders players
People educated at Daramalan College
Rugby league halfbacks
Rugby league players from Canberra
Souths Logan Magpies players